Ellen Southard was an American full-rigged merchant ship from Bath, Maine that was built in 1863 by prominent shipbuilder T.J. Southard.  She plied international trade routes for twelve years, calling at ports as far away as Sydney.

On 27 September 1875, the ship wrecked in the mouth of the Mersey River at Liverpool during a hurricane-strength storm.  Shore-based lifeboats crewed mainly by volunteers set out from several lifeboat stations to the aid of the distressed ship after it foundered on a sandbank.  One of the lifeboats capsized in heavy seas after picking up the ship's crew, resulting in nine people from the ship as well as three rescuers losing their lives.

Following the advice of the US consul at Liverpool, the United States Congress recognised the acts of bravery by issuing 27 Gold Lifesaving Medals to the lifeboat men who attempted to save her crew, after a two-year delay during which US law first had to be changed to allow the newly instituted medals to be awarded to non-US citizens.  Debate about lifeboat designs continued for many years until a self-righting design was eventually adopted.

Description

Ellen Southard was built in 1863 in Richmond, Maine, by prominent local shipbuilder T. J. Southard. She was named after the builder's daughter, Ellen, to whom he also gave a one-sixteenth share of the vessel. The ship was classified "A1" in the Lloyds Register, meaning that her hull and fittings were of the highest grade.

Ellen Southard plied international trade routes from her homeport in Bath, Maine, with visits documented in ports as far away as Sydney, Australia. In 1864, she recorded the longest duration voyage of any ship transporting railway locomotives from the east to the west coast of the United States. The ship took 205 days to complete the passage after she was delayed for 48 days by unfavourable winds off Cape Horn.

In June 1867, shortly after departing Hong Kong for California with 360 Chinese passengers, Ellen Southard'''s master, Captain Howe, died at sea. His wife took charge of the ship, but the passengers and crew became mutinous when the water supply dwindled; she resorted to using a revolver to keep them at bay until a passing ship encountered Ellen Southard adrift  from Santa Cruz, California. The captain raised the alarm upon reaching port, whereupon the  went to the assistance of the distressed ship.

 Loss 
On 12 August 1875, Ellen Southard set sail for Liverpool in England from Saint John, New Brunswick, under the command of Captain Henry Woodworth with a load of tropical deal, a type of softwood. The captain's wife and fifteen crew members were on board.  She was approaching the River Mersey on 26 September 1875 when the most violent storm to hit the region in 36 years struck. It began at 9 pm, increasing rapidly in intensity to hurricane strength by midnight; the storm remained at this level until 2 am. Buildings were damaged ashore, with two people killed by falling masonry, while on the river, vessels were blown from their moorings and damaged by colliding with one another or with the quays.Ellen Southard had rounded the northern tip of Wales, passing Point Lynas at 1 pm on the day of the storm. After receiving the pilot on board, she was taken in tow by the steamtug United Kingdom under the command of Captain Griffiths for the final leg of her journey into the port of Liverpool. By 9 pm, conditions had become very stormy, and her sails were taken down; by the time she reached Formby, the ship could no longer be steered, and the tow line was also lost. Ellen Southard dropped her anchors, but they did not hold in the ever-strengthening storm.  Finding that it was unable to offer further assistance, the tug set off for Liverpool with the purpose of returning with a lifeboat, but was soon grounded, thereby leaving the stricken American ship to fend for herself. By midnight when the storm reached its peak, Ellen Southard was dismasted and grounded on Jordan Flats about a mile from Crosby lighthouse.  The waves crashed heavily on her, and she started to break up as she thumped on the sandbank. The crew were unable to signal for assistance until first light as the vessel did not carry any signal flares – in the interim, they lashed themselves to what remained of the ship to prevent being swept away by the heavy sea.

Lifeboat disaster
At just after 5 am, the Mersey Docks and Harbour Board's lifeboat station received a telegram stating that a ship was in distress.  Nine minutes later, the three-year-old tubular lifeboat set out with fourteen volunteers under the command of Captain James Martin.  The steam tug Rattler initially took the Liverpool boat in tow, as the properties that made it suitable as a lifeboat also made it very heavy to row. At approximately the same time that the Liverpool lifeboat was departing Mersey Docks, the New Brighton, Formby and Hoylake boats also got underway, with the New Brighton RNLI boat in tow behind Sprindrift. The hurricane had abated somewhat, but the sea was still heavy, which made the rowers' work very difficult in shallower water where the tugs could no longer assist them.

When the Liverpool lifeboat came alongside the wreck, some of those aboard were able to jump directly into the lifeboat, but others had to be roped in. The steward, who was the last person on the doomed ship, decided to go back to recover his bag; minutes passed while the people in the lifeboat waited anxiously until he eventually re-appeared and joined them. Seventeen people including the pilot were taken onto the lifeboat. Finally, the lifeboat was able to get clear of the wreck and navigate its way through the floating debris to start its return journey to the dock.

The wind, tide and sea made it impossible for the Liverpool lifeboat to link up with the waiting tug for another tow, so the men were forced to start rowing home.  About twenty minutes later, as the boat reached the relatively safer waters of the channel, the master elected to raise the foresail to help steady the vessel.  People in the lifeboat were still congratulating themselves on their lucky escape, when Captain Martin noticed a huge wave "like a high wall" approaching. He instructed everyone to hold on, fearing that someone might be washed overboard.  However rather than breaking over the boat, the wave lifted it and flipped it over. The boat was not self-righting, so the remaining survivors were left clinging desperately to the upturned boat. Rattlers master witnessed the incident and signalled to the New Brighton lifeboat, Willie and Arthur, which promptly turned around to come to the rescue. The men who were on the capsized boat directed the New Brighton lifeboat to first assist three others who were in more danger clinging to bits of wood in the sea. After picking up the survivors and one casualty, the New Brighton lifeboat was taken in tow by Rattler, which brought her back to New Brighton.  Six of Ellen Southards crew, the captain and his wife, as well as the pilot and three lifeboat men from Mersey Docks drowned or died of exposure (12 fatalities in total).

Labourers were employed to salvage the valuable wood that washed up on Crosby Beach; among the items found were a hat belonging to the captain's wife and a concertina belonging to one of the crew. Two bodies were also seen in the water.

A court of enquiry was held the following month in Liverpool by the Board of Trade, and focused particularly on the roles of the captains in the tragedy as well as the design of the Liverpool lifeboat. The court found that no-one was to blame for the loss of either Ellen Southard'' or the Liverpool lifeboat. Captain James Martin and his crew were praised for their gallantry in getting everyone off the ship, and absolved of any blame with respect to the capsizing of the lifeboat. The lifeboat was furthermore found to be of sound design and suitably adapted to her role, but debate continued for many years about the merits of the tubular design vs the self-righting one, as well as the requirement for lifeboats to be powered.  After twelve years of deliberation, a decision was finally made to adopt self-righting lifeboats.

Lifesaving medals

General Lucius Fairchild, the United States consul at Liverpool, wrote to his government recommending that the gallantry of the Englishmen who were involved in the rescue effort be recognised. The Secretary of State supported his recommendation and the United States Congress moved to award the newly instituted Lifesaving Medal to the lifeboat men. A delay of 17 months followed during which legislation was enacted to allow the medals to be issued to non-US nationals. Finally, in 1877, the United States government awarded first-class Gold Lifesaving Medals to the twenty-seven men of the Mersey Docks and New Brighton RNLI lifeboat station who survived the incident, while the families of the three deceased lifeboat men were awarded a sum of $200.00 in gold in lieu of a medal. The medals were conferred in a public ceremony in Liverpool Town Hall on 27 February 1877 that was attended by the US Consul and the masters of most of the US ships that were in port at the time. The coins were incorrectly engraved with the ship’s date of departure from New Brunswick (12 August) instead of the date of the tragedy (26 September).

See also
 Southport and St Anne's lifeboats disaster
 Penlee lifeboat disaster

Notes

Footnotes

References

External links
 Photographic Print of Life-Saving Medal presented by the United States Government to the Men of the Royal National Lifeboat Institution
 The American Ship Ellen Southard
 More on the Gold Lifesaving Medal of the First Class

Maritime incidents in September 1875
Shipwrecks of England
Shipwrecks in the Irish Sea
Full-rigged ships
Age of Sail merchant ships of the United States
1863 ships
United Kingdom–United States relations
Disasters in Merseyside
Royal National Lifeboat Institution
1875 in England
Ships built in Bath, Maine